Artur Kacper Szalpuk (born 20 March 1995) is a Polish professional volleyball player, a former member of the Poland national team, and the 2018 World Champion. At the professional club level, he plays for Projekt Warsaw.

Career

National team
On 2 April 2015, Szalpuk was called up to the Poland national team by head coach Stéphane Antiga. After the training camp in Spała he went to team B of Polish national team led by Andrzej Kowal. He took part in 1st edition of 2015 European Games, where his national team took 4th place. In July he joined team A of Poland on matches with United States during intercontinental round of World League 2015 in Kraków. He made his debut in senior team on 4 July 2015 in lost match with United States (1–3).

On 30 September 2018 Poland achieved title of the 2018 World Champion. Poland beat Brazil in the final 3–0 and defended the title from 2014.

Honours

Clubs
 National championships
 2017/2018  Polish Cup, with Trefl Gdańsk
 2018/2019  Polish SuperCup, with PGE Skra Bełchatów
 2021/2022  Ukrainian Championship, with Epicentr-Podolyany

Youth national team
 2013  CEV U19 European Championship
 2013  European Youth Olympic Festival

Individual awards
 2017: Polish Cup – Best Server
 2018: Polish Cup – Best Opposite

State awards
 2018:  Gold Cross of Merit

References

External links

 
 Player profile at PlusLiga.pl   
 Player profile at Volleybox.net 

1995 births
Living people
Sportspeople from Olsztyn
Polish men's volleyball players
European Games competitors for Poland
Volleyball players at the 2015 European Games
Polish expatriate sportspeople in Ukraine
Expatriate volleyball players in Ukraine
Projekt Warsaw players
Czarni Radom players
Skra Bełchatów players
Trefl Gdańsk players
Outside hitters
21st-century Polish people